Rats, also known as Rats NYC, is a 2016 American documentary horror film directed by Morgan Spurlock. Based on a book by Robert Sullivan and distributed by the Discovery Channel, the film chronicles rat infestations in major cities throughout the world.

Synopsis
The film primarily focuses on rat infestations and exterminations, including methods such as night-patrol teams in Mumbai snapping rats' necks and the practice of ratting in England. Much of the documentary has been considered a detailing of "the 'war' against rats", featuring "bashing, slicing, dissecting and poisoning". The director also journeys to the Karni Mata Temple in Rajasthan, India, where over 35,000 black rats are revered by devotees who believe them to be reincarnated human beings.

Release and reception
The documentary premiered at the Toronto International Film Festival on September 13, 2016. The film premiered on television on October 22, 2016, airing on the Discovery Channel.

The Daily Telegraph reported on the film's trailer for its "stomach-churning footage" and "disturbing scenes", with writer Rebecca Hawkes noting that the trailer's footage, which includes live rats being killed by terriers, "will likely provoke a strong response from viewers". The Hollywood Reporter wrote that the documentary "plays much like a horror film", and in reference to the terrier scene, called it "an absolute bloodbath ... with filters appropriate for a zombie apocalypse". Wendy Ide of The Guardian wrote that the film is "gleefully exploitative in its approach, and as such, it is horribly entertaining". Peter Debruge of Variety called the film "super-disgusting" and "[un]fair to the animals in question, who would surely view this as a grisly, “Faces of Death”-style marathon of murder", writing that "rarely has a filmmaker more blatantly manipulated the material he has collected to game his audience".

Accolades

References

External links
 
 Rats at Rotten Tomatoes

2016 films
2016 documentary films
American documentary films
Documentary films about urban animals
Films shot in Cambodia
Films shot in England
Films shot in Mumbai
Films shot in New York City
Films shot in Rajasthan
American natural horror films
2016 horror films
Docuhorror films
Films directed by Morgan Spurlock
2010s English-language films
2010s American films